No Limits is the second studio album by Canadian punk rock band Reset. It was released in 1999, and re-released in 2006.

Track listing
 "I Know" (0:52)
 "Pollution" (2:53)
 "Planet Earth" (2:25)
 "My Dream and I" (2:37)
 "Let Me Go" (4:08)
 "Pressure" (3:08)
 "The End" (1:41)
 "What Now?" (3:20)
 "Blew It Off" (1:50)
 "Wide Open" (1:03)
 "Big Brother" (2:28)
 "Friend" (2:56)
 "Double Cross" (18:06) 
 The song "Double Cross" ends at 4:35. After 11 minutes and 10 seconds of silence (4:35 - 15:45), starts an untitled hidden track.

Personnel
 Pierre Bouvier - bass, lead vocals
 Phil Jolicoeur - guitar, vocals
 Adrian White - drums/guitar/samples, keyboards
 Greg Reely - production, mixer, engineering, mastering
 Reset - production
 Leslie Symansky - pictures
 Patrick Francis Guay - artwork
 Chuck Comeau - creative input
 J.S. Boileau - creative input

2000 albums
Albums recorded at The Warehouse Studio
Reset (Canadian band) albums